Edward John Bartels (October 8, 1925 – November 4, 2007) was an American basketball player.

He played collegiately for North Carolina State University.

He played for the Denver Nuggets and New York Knicks (1949–50) and Washington Capitols (1950–51) in the NBA for 32 games.

NBA career statistics

Regular season

External links

1925 births
2007 deaths
Basketball players from New York City
American men's basketball players
Denver Nuggets (1948–1950) players
Forwards (basketball)
NC State Wolfpack men's basketball players
New York Knicks players
Utica Pros players
Washington Capitols players
Wilkes-Barre Barons players